Corporate titles or business titles are given to company and organization officials to show what duties and responsibilities they have in the organization. These roles are often referred to as "C-level", "C-suite" or "CxO" positions because many of them start with the word "Chief".  Many positions at this level report to the president or Chief Executive Officer, or to the company's Board of Directors.  In publicly traded companies, people in senior executive positions such as these might also have some degree of responsibility for maintaining and increasing the company's stock price, making them accountable to the company's shareholders.

List of corporate titles 
 Chief administrative officer (CAO) - A top-tier executive who supervises the daily operations of a business and is ultimately responsible for its performance
 Chief analytics officer (CAO) - The senior manager responsible for the analysis of data within an organization
 Chief brand officer (CBO) - Officer responsible for a brand's image, experience, and promise
 Chief business development officer (CBDO) -  Identifies new opportunities for the corporation and develops strategies to pursue those opportunities
 Chief business officer (CBO) - A position that allocates a company’s resources to meet strategic and financial goals.
 Chief cloud officer (CCO) - The individual within a business who has the primary responsibility to ensure the organization is getting the most out of cloud computing
 Chief commercial officer (CCO) - Officer responsible for the commercial strategy and the development of an organization
 Chief communications officer (CCO) - The head of communications, public relations, and public affairs in an organization
 Chief compliance officer (CCO) - Person primarily responsible for overseeing and managing regulatory compliance issues within an organization
 Chief content officer (CCO) - Responsible for the digital media creation and multi-channel publication of the organization's content (text, video, audio, animation, etc.)
 Chief creative officer (CCO) - Officer who directs a company's creative output, developing the artistic design strategy that defines the company's brand
 Chief customer officer (CCO) - Responsible in customer-centric companies for the total relationship with an organization’s customers
 Chief data officer (CDO) - Responsible for enterprise-wide governance and utilization of information as an asset, via data processing, analysis, data mining, information trading and other means
 Chief design officer (CDO) - Typically responsible for overseeing all design and innovation aspects of a company's products and services, including product design, graphic design, user experience design, industrial design, and package design
 Chief digital officer (CDO) - An individual who helps an organization drive growth by converting "analog" businesses to digital ones using the potential of modern online technologies and data (i.e., digital transformation ), and at times oversees operations in digital sectors like mobile applications, social media and related applications, virtual goods, as well as web-based information management and marketing
 Chief diversity officer (CDO) - An organization’s executive-level diversity and inclusion strategist
 Chief executive officer (CEO) - The most senior corporate, executive, or administrative officer in charge of managing an organization
 Chief experience officer (CXO) - Executive responsible for the overall experience of an organization's products and services
 Chief financial officer (CFO) - Primarily responsible for managing the company's finances, including financial planning, management of financial risks, record-keeping, and financial reporting
 Chief gaming officer (CGO) - Executive in charge of heading both the game development and the online and offline publishing functions of a company
 Chief genealogical officer (CGO) - Maintains the genealogical integrity of an organization
 Chief growth officer (CGO) - Identifies areas where the company can grow, measured in revenue, or user/subscriber base or equivalent
 Chief human resources officer (CHRO) - A corporate officer who oversees all aspects of human resource management and industrial relations policies, practices, and operations for an organization
 Chief information officer (CIO) - Alongside the CTO, often the most senior executive in an enterprise who works with information technology and computer systems, in order to support enterprise goals. Generally they focus on the internal technology requirements, leaving strategy, product and customer-facing issues with the CTO.
 Chief information officer (higher education) (CIO) - The senior executive who is responsible for information and communications technology in the university, college or other higher education institution
 Chief information security officer (CISO) - The senior-level executive within an organization responsible for establishing and maintaining the enterprise vision, strategy, and program to ensure information assets and technologies are adequately protected
 Chief innovation officer (CINO) - A person in a company who is primarily responsible for managing the process of innovation and change management in an organization, as well as being in some cases the person who "originates new ideas but also recognizes innovative ideas generated by other people"
 Chief investment officer (CIO) - The one whose purpose is to understand, manage, and monitor their organization's portfolio of assets, devise strategies for growth, act as the liaison with investors, and recognize and avoid serious risks, including those never before encountered
 Chief knowledge officer (CKO) - Officer responsible for managing intellectual capital and the custodian of knowledge management practices in an organization
 Chief learning officer (CLO) - The person in charge of learning management, be it corporate or personal training
 Chief legal officer (CLO) - The officer in charge of all an organization’s legal affairs
 Chief marketing officer (CMO) - Corporate executive responsible for marketing activities in an organization
 Chief operating officer (COO) - The COO is responsible for the daily operation of a company
 Chief people officer (CPO) - Person in charge of every aspect of the employee life cycle in an organization
 Chief privacy officer (CPO) - Officer responsible for managing risks related to information privacy laws and regulations
 Chief process officer (CPO) - An executive responsible for business process management at the highest level of an organization
 Chief product officer (CPO) - An executive responsible for various product-related activities in an organization
 Chief reputation officer (CRO) - A CRO is responsible for reputation, brand, public relations and public affairs
 Chief research officer (CRO) - Officer responsible for research that supports enterprise goals
 Chief restructuring officer (CRO) - A senior officer of a company given broad powers to renegotiate all aspects of a company’s finances to deal with an impending bankruptcy or to restructure a company following a bankruptcy filing
 Chief revenue officer (CRO) - A corporate officer responsible for all revenue generation processes in an organization
 Chief risk officer (CRO) - The executive accountable for enabling the efficient and effective governance of significant risks, and related opportunities, to a business and its various segments. Risks are commonly categorized as strategic, reputational, operational, financial, or compliance-related.
 Chief scientific officer (CSO) - A position at the head of scientific research operations at an organizations or company performing significant scientific research projects
 Chief security officer (CSO) - Senior executive accountable for the development and oversight of compliance, operational, strategic, financial and reputation security risk policies and programs intended for the mitigation and reduction of strategies relating to the protection of people, intellectual assets and tangible property
 Chief services officer (CSO) - Responsible for developing processes and tools, both internally and externally, for producing maximum value to all stakeholders with intelligent and efficient use of potentially fluctuating human resources
 Chief solutions officer (CSO) - Executive responsible for the identification, development and delivery of business solutions and services
 Chief strategy officer (CSO) - Responsible for developing strategy, managing the strategic planning process, and optimizing the corporate portfolio through M&A and divestitures
 Chief supply chain officer (CSCO) - Involves the movement and storage of raw materials, of work–in–progress inventory, and of finished goods from point of origin to point of consumption
 Chief sustainability officer (CSO) - Corporate executive in charge of a corporation's "environmental" programmes
 Chief technical officer (CTO) - A variation of chief technology officer
 Chief technological product designer (CTPO) - Uses their design skills and technical knowledge to design new and improve existing products work and looks
 Chief technology officer (CTO) - CTOs make decisions for the overarching technology infrastructure that closely align with an organization's goals, and tend to be more focused on strategic and customer facing or product issues. While CIOs focus more on internal infrastructure of a company and work alongside an organization's IT staff members to perform everyday operations.
 Chief technology security officer (CTSO) - The senior-level executive within an organization responsible for establishing and maintaining the enterprise security technical vision, controls, and program to ensure information assets and technologies are adequately protected. Some organizations have both a CISO and a CTSO.
 Chief visibility officer (CVO) - An individual appointed to oversee all aspects of performance across retail stores, corporations or organizations
 Chief visionary officer (CVO) - Officer responsible of creating a forward vision for a company
 Chief web officer (CWO) - Person in charge of an organisation's Internet presence, including all Internet and intranet sites
 President (corporate title)

References

External links 

Chief Cloud Officer vs Chief Information Officer see https://www.zycomtec.com/chief-cloud-officer-cco-cco-versus-cio-in-business/
Chief Cloud Officer read DBA Transformations Building Your Career in the Transition to On-Demand Cloud Computing and Extreme Automation 2018 by Michelle Malcher  
AVANT Hires Ron Hayman as Chief Cloud Officer Carly by DeRosa 07.28.2015 https://goavant.co.uk/avant-hires-ron-hayman-as-chief-cloud-officer/
Chief Cloud Officers - On governance structures for the cloud computing services and assessing their effectiveness by  Acklesh Prasad; Peter Green; Jon Heales. 1467-0895/© 2014 Elsevier Inc. 
Chief Cloud Officer - On Structural Considerations for Governing the Cloud by Acklesh Prasad; Peter Green; Glen Finau; Jon Heales. Proceedings of the Nineteenth Americas Conference on Information Systems, Chicago, Illinois, August 15-17, 2013
Chief Cloud Officer - Practical Guide to Cloud Computing Version 3.0 December, 2017 Cloud Standards Customer Council https://www.omg.org/cloud/deliverables/CSCC-Practical-Guide-to-Cloud-Computing.pdf

Corporate titles

corporate titles